William Northcut Sweeney (May 5, 1832 – April 21, 1895) was a U.S. Representative from Kentucky.

Born in Liberty, Kentucky, Sweeney attended the common schools and Bethany College.
He studied law.
He was admitted to the bar in 1853 and commenced practice in Liberty, Kentucky.
He moved to Owensboro, Daviess County, in 1853.
He served as prosecuting attorney of Daviess County 1854-1858.
He served as presidential elector on the Democratic ticket of Douglas and Johnson in 1860.

Sweeney was elected as a Democrat to the Forty-first Congress (March 4, 1869 – March 3, 1871).
He was renominated in 1870, but declined to accept the nomination.
He resumed the practice of law in Owensboro, Kentucky, and died there April 21, 1895.
He was interred in Rosehill Elmwood Cemetery.

References

External links 
 

1832 births
1895 deaths
Bethany College (West Virginia) alumni
Kentucky lawyers
People from Liberty, Kentucky
Democratic Party members of the United States House of Representatives from Kentucky
Politicians from Owensboro, Kentucky
19th-century American politicians
19th-century American lawyers